Hāliġmōnaþ or Hāliȝmōnaþ (modern English: 'holy month') was the Anglo-Saxon name for the month of September.

The name was recorded by the Anglo-Saxon scholar Bede in his treatise De temporum ratione (The Reckoning of  Time), saying only "Halegh-monath is a month of sacredness."

An entry in the Menologium seu Calendarium Poeticum, an Anglo-Saxon poem about the months, explains that “in the ninth month in the year there are thirty days. The month is called in Latin September, and in our language holy month, because our ancestors, when they were heathen, sacrificed to their idols in that month.”

See also

Germanic calendar
Anglo-Saxon
Old English

References

September
Old English